Cecilio Plá y Gallardo (22 November 1860 – 4 August 1934) was a Spanish painter and illustrator.

Biography
Cecilio Plá was born in Valencia. Later, he followed his own desires to be an artist and continued his studies at the Instituto San Pablo and the Real Academia de Bellas Artes de San Carlos. After winning a Silver Medal at the Exposición de Valencia in 1879, he moved to Madrid with a friend, where he entered the Real Academia de Bellas Artes de San Fernando, becoming a student of Emilio Sala.

The following year, after travelling through Portugal, France and Italy, he settled in Rome. From there, he sent home numerous works, mostly in the Costumbrismo genre, which showed the influence of Marià Fortuny. Some were shown at the National Exhibition of Fine Arts, winning medals in 1884 and 1887 for paintings on Italian subjects. He received many more medals over the next two decades, including a Medal of Honor at the Exposition Universelle (1900). From 1893 to 1910, he drew illustrations for several periodicals, including La Ilustración Española y Americana, and Blanco y Negro.

In 1910, he began his career as a teacher at the Academy of San Fernando, succeeding Sala in the Chair of "Color Aesthetics and Painting Procedures", which he held until his retirement in 1931. He was named an Academician in 1924. His dedication to teaching drastically reduced his artistic output. Juan Gris was, perhaps, his best-known student. He also published a "Pictorial Art Primer".

In addition to his paintings and drawings, he worked on many public projects, completing the work begun by Sala at the Casino de Madrid and providing decorations for the Círculo de Bellas Artes. He died in Madrid, aged 73.

Selected paintings

References

Further reading
 Cecilio Pla: Madrid, 18 de noviembre de 1998-17 de enero de 1999, exhibition catalog, Fundación Cultural Mapfre Vida, 1998

External links 

 Documentary movie, Cecilio Plá (1980), directed by César Fernández Ardavín, produced by Aro Films.
 More works by Plá @ The Atheneum.
 
                                                                       

1860 births
1934 deaths
People from Valencia
19th-century Spanish painters
Spanish male painters
20th-century Spanish painters
20th-century Spanish male artists
Real Academia de Bellas Artes de San Fernando alumni
19th-century Spanish male artists